Vegetable Soup is an American educational children's television program produced by the New York State Education Department that originally ran on PBS from September 22, 1975 to December 14, 1978. NBC concurrently broadcast the series on Sunday mornings, with at least some affiliates showing it along with NBC's regular Saturday morning cartoon lineup; this was a rare instance of a television program seen on both commercial and public television at the same time.

All 78 episodes of Vegetable Soup were digitized by the New York State Archives and made available online in the American Archive of Public Broadcasting. Episodes are made up of a mix of live action, cartoon, puppetry, and mixed-media segments.

Concept
The purpose of the program was to be a television series for children to help counter the negative, destructive effects of racial prejudice and racial isolation and to reinforce and dramatize the positive, life-enhancing value of human diversity in entertaining and affective presentations that children could understand and relate to. Vegetable Soup used an interdisciplinary approach to entertain and educate elementary age children in the value of human diversity.

The show combined music, animation, puppetry and live action film, on the subject of economic, racial and ethnic diversity.

Regular segments
The Big Game Hunt - hosted by Gary Goodrow
The Big Job Hunt - hosted by Susan Taylor (Season Two only)
Children's Questions
How Do You Find Yourself?
Know Yourself
Long Ago
Luther
Make A New Friend
Mr. Emeritus
Nigel
Outerscope 1 (Called Outerscope II in season two)
Real People
Storytelling Time
Superlative Horse
What Do You Want To Be When You Grow Up?
What Would You Do?
Woody the Spoon Recipes
Words Have Stories

Characters 
Long John Spoilsport (James Earl Jones) - regularly appeared on "The Big Game Hunt" and "The Big Job Hunt" segments
Larry Hama - hosted various segments
Kingman Hui - child actor who starred on the "Long Ago" segment
Martin Harris (Martin Brayboy) - regularly appeared in the "Nigel" segment
Eddie (Edward M. Beckford, Jr.) - regularly appeared in the "Nigel" segment, sang the opening theme song
Scot Richardson (Scot Smith) - regularly appeared in the "Nigel" segment
Bob (Daniel Stern) and Robin (Judy Noble) - regularly appeared in the "Outerscope" segment
Woody the Spoon (Bette Midler) - regularly appeared in the "Woody the Spoon Recipes" segment

Animations
Animated segments on the show were created by Jim Simon's Wantu Studios, the musical opening plus 13 Woody the Spoon cooking spots for which Bette Midler did all the voice tracks, and also 48 thirty-second breaks.

Beginning in the show's second season, many animated segments were also produced by Colossal Pictures, of which Vegetable Soup was one of its first assignments. Animators Drew Takahashi and Gary Gutierrez worked on Vegetable Soup during its first season, prior to Colossal Pictures' founding.

See also
 High Feather

References

External links
 TV.com: Vegetable Soup TV Show
 
 Vegetable Soup: Parent-Teacher Guide
 Flexitoons: Olga Felgemacher Biography
 Michael Sporn Animation: Jim Simon Biography
 Vegetable Soup Collection in the American Archive of Public Broadcasting

PBS Kids shows
1975 American television series debuts
1978 American television series endings
1970s American children's television series
American children's education television series
PBS original programming
NBC original programming
Personal development television series
Education in New York (state)
American television shows featuring puppetry
American television series with live action and animation